Ann Dooley is a professor emerita with the Centre for Medieval Studies and the Celtic Studies Program at St. Michael's College at the University of Toronto where she specializes in Irish literature. She has published a translation of Acallam na Senórach entitled Tales of the Elders of Ireland as well as a study of Táin Bó Cuailnge entitled Playing the Hero: Reading the Irish Saga Táin Bó Cuailnge''.

Published works
Dooley, Ann; and Roe, Harry (translators) (1999). Tales of the Elders of Ireland. Oxford. 
Dooley, Ann. (2006). Playing the Hero: Reading the Irish Saga Táin Bó Cuailnge.'' Toronto.

References

External links
Entry at the Bibliography of Irish Linguistics and Literature 1972-

Celtic studies scholars
Irish scholars and academics
Canadian people of Irish descent
Canadian literary critics
Women literary critics
Living people
Academic staff of the University of Toronto
Year of birth missing (living people)
Canadian women academics